Jan Carla Garavaglia, M.D (born September 14, 1956), sometimes known as "Dr. G", served as the chief medical examiner for Orange and Osceola counties in Orlando, Florida, from 2004 until her retirement in May 2015. She starred in the series Dr. G: Medical Examiner on the Discovery Health channel which aired in July 2004 until 2012. Repeats of the show are aired on the Discovery Life channel and Justice Network. Garavaglia has appeared on The Oprah Winfrey Show, Larry King Live, The Rachael Ray Show, The Doctors and The Dr. Oz Show. She was on Head rush with Kari Byron

Early life and education
Garavaglia was born in St. Louis, Missouri, to Charles and Jennie Garavaglia. She graduated from Lindbergh High School in 1974. Garavaglia received her medical degree from the St. Louis University School of Medicine and completed an internship in internal medicine and residency in anatomic/clinical pathology at St. Louis University Hospital. She completed a fellowship in forensic pathology at the Dade County Medical Examiner's Office in Miami, Florida. She is board-certified in combined anatomic and clinical pathology and forensic pathology.

Family
Garavaglia married her first husband in 1980. In 1988, she got her first job as an Associate Medical Examiner in Duval County, Jacksonville, Florida and gave birth to their first son. Garavaglia and her family moved to Georgia in 1991 where she took a job as Associate Medical Examiner for the next two years. In 1993, the family moved once again to San Antonio, Texas where Garavaglia spent the next ten years as a Medical Examiner in the Bexar County Forensic Science Center. Their second son was born during this time, in 1994. Garavaglia and her first husband later divorced in 2006, and in 2007 she married her second husband, Dr. Mark Wallace, whom she had met years earlier while attending medical school. Dr. Wallace has made several appearances on Dr. G: Medical Examiner as an expert in infectious disease and internal medicine. The couple reside in Mount Vernon, WA.

Career
One of the first cases Garavaglia worked on as a medical examiner was the Morning Glory Funeral Home scandal, in which 37 bodies, many in advanced stages of decomposition, were found in a funeral home. After several caskets that the funeral director had buried were exhumed, Garavaglia determined that the director had placed multiple persons in single caskets, and pocketed the money he received.

As an associate medical examiner in Bexar County, Texas, Garavaglia autopsied the body of Tracie McBride at the Bexar County Forensic Science Center in San Antonio, Texas. The case was covered on Dr. G. McBride was murdered by Louis Jones, who was executed by the federal government in 2003.

On December 11, 2008, Garavaglia autopsied the remains of a small child that was confirmed to be those of missing Caylee Anthony. Garavaglia testified about her findings during the murder trial of Caylee’s mother, Casey Anthony.

In 2008, Garavaglia authored How Not to Die, in which she relates her experiences as a medical examiner to educate readers about how to care for their health and avoid premature death.

On May 18, 2012, Garavaglia delivered the keynote address at the opening ceremonies of the 2012 Science Olympiad National Tournament at the University of Central Florida.

After more than two decades in the practice of forensic pathology, Garavaglia retired from the District 9 medical examiner's office on May 28, 2015. She and her husband retired to her husband's hometown, 90 minutes north of Seattle, Washington.

How Not to Die
How Not to Die: Surprising Lessons on Living Longer, Safer, and Healthier from America’s Favorite Medical Examiner is a book about safe and healthy living written by Jan Garavaglia. The book was released on October 14, 2008 by Crown Publishing, a division of Random House. Using cases from her 20 years of experience as a medical examiner, Garavaglia identifies some lifestyle and behavioral choices that may result in premature death. She also offers advice on how to be smart and proactive about one's health. The Library Journal has called the book "surprisingly entertaining".

References

External links 
Official Website

1956 births
Living people
Medical examiners
American coroners
American writers of Italian descent
Scientists from St. Louis
People from Mount Vernon, Washington
21st-century American non-fiction writers
American health and wellness writers
American women non-fiction writers
Scientists from Washington (state)
People from Jacksonville, Florida
Scientists from Florida
People from Bexar County, Texas
Scientists from Texas
21st-century American women writers